The Absalom Fowler House is a historic house at 502 East 7th Street in Little Rock, Arkansas.  It is a two-story brick building, with a hip roof and a front portico supported by fluted Ionic columns and topped by a balustrade.  The building is encircled by an entablature with modillion blocks and an unusual double row of dentil moulding giving a checkerboard effect.  The house was built in about 1840 by Absalom Fowler, a lawyer prominent in the state's early history.  The house is now surrounded by a multi-building apartment complex.

The house was listed on the National Register of Historic Places in 1973.

See also
National Register of Historic Places listings in Little Rock, Arkansas

References

Houses on the National Register of Historic Places in Arkansas
Houses completed in 1839
Houses in Little Rock, Arkansas
National Register of Historic Places in Little Rock, Arkansas
Historic district contributing properties in Arkansas